Ilie Moț (26 April 1946 – 1982/83) was a Romanian football forward.

Honours
UTA Arad
Divizia A: 1968–69, 1969–70

References

External links
Ilie Moț at Labtof.ro

1946 births
Romanian footballers
Association football forwards
Liga I players
Liga II players
FC UTA Arad players
Vagonul Arad players
1982 deaths
People from Arad County